Little Bonnet Lake, in Highlands County, Florida, is about  west of Lake Letta and about twice as far south of Lake Lotela. This lake is bounded on the southwest by a rail line and on the southeast and part of the north side by citrus groves. A golf course borders Little Bonnet Lake on the northwest.

On the lake's northeast shore is a public boat ramp, that is reached by going through the area's golf course.  A canal allows boats to travel east to Lake Letta and by a series of canals a number of area lakes may be accessed from Little Bonnet Lake.  There are no public swimming beaches, but fishing is allowed.  The HookandBullet.Com website says the lake contains blue catfish, gar and bowfin.

References

Lakes of Highlands County, Florida
Lakes of Florida